Saint-Gravé is a commune in the Morbihan department of Brittany in northwestern France.

Geography
The canal de Nantes à Brest forms part of the commune's northern border; the river Arz forms all of its southern border.

Demographics
Inhabitants of Saint-Gravé are called Gravéens in French.

See also
Communes of the Morbihan department

References

External links

Official website 
 Mayors of Morbihan Association 

Saintgrave